There are several municipalities and communities have the name Langnau in Switzerland: 

Langnau am Albis, in the canton of Zürich
Langnau bei Reiden, in the canton of Lucerne
Langnau im Emmental, in the canton of Bern
Langnau bei Märwil, in Affeltrangen municipality, canton of Thurgau